Francois Bise (died 1983) was a French chef and restaurateur.

His mother, Marguerite Bise was a chef and restaurateur at Auberge du Père Bise in Talloires, Haute-Savoie, and one of the first women to win three Michelin stars.

Francois Bise trained under the father of modern French cuisine, Fernand Point.

In 1968 he became head chef at Auberge du Père Bise, his mother having died in 1965. He once again won three stars for the restaurant during the 1970s.

Bise died in 1983 of cancer. His wife, Charlyne, continues to run the restaurant and his daughter, Sophie Bise, won back their third Michelin star when she was only 21.

References

French chefs
Head chefs of Michelin starred restaurants
French restaurateurs
Year of birth missing
1983 deaths